Mats Patrik Josef Wranå (born 22 January 1965) is a Swedish curler and curling coach.

At the international level, he is a two-time .

At the national level, he is a 1995 Swedish men's champion curler.

In 2017 she was inducted into the Swedish Curling Hall of Fame.

Teams

Men

Mixed

Mixed doubles

Record as a coach of national teams

Personal life
Mats Wranå is from a well-known Swedish curling family: his son Rasmus Wranå is a World, European and Swedish champion, member of Niklas Edin's team; his daughter Isabella Wranå is a World Universiade', European Mixed and Swedish champion; his wife Monika is also a curler, Mats's mixed doubles partner.

References

External links

Living people
1965 births
Swedish male curlers
Swedish curling champions
Swedish curling coaches